Earl M. Baker (born January 22, 1940) is an American politician from Pennsylvania who served as a Republican member of the Pennsylvania State Senate for the 19th district from 1989 to 1995. Baker also served twelve years as a member of the Chester County Board of Commissioners, and as Chairman of the Republican State Committee of Pennsylvania from 1986 to 1990.

Early life and education
Baker was born in Philadelphia, Pennsylvania and graduated from Ben Lippen High School.  He received an A.B. in political science from University of North Carolina, Chapel Hill and a M.A. and Ph.D. in government from American University in Washington, D.C..

He served as an officer in the U.S. Navy.  He worked for The American Political Science Association in Washington and taught at Temple University before entering public service.

Career
Baker did not seek re-election to the Board of Commissioners in 1988, opting instead to run for the State Senate seat being vacated by retiring incumbent John Stauffer. In the primary election, he defeated State Rep. Peter Vroon.

References

1940 births
20th-century American politicians
American University alumni
Chairs of the Republican State Committee of Pennsylvania
Living people
Republican Party Pennsylvania state senators
United States Navy officers
University of North Carolina at Chapel Hill alumni
Chester County Commissioners (Pennsylvania)